Picon Pie was an Off-Broadway musical written by Rose Leiman Goldemberg and produced by Edmund Gaynes. It opened in New York City at the DR2 Theatre on July 15, 2004 and starred Barbara Minkus as Molly Picon. The production moved to the Lamb's Theatre on February 17, 2005. It closed on June 2, 2005.

Cast and credits

Molly Picon was played by Barbara Minkus. After production moved to the Lamb's Theatre, Molly Ricon was played by June Gable. The understudy for Molly was Carolyn Seiff. Jacob 'Yonkel' Kalich was played by Stuart Zagnit and his understudy was Stuart Marshall.

The Off-Broadway production was directed by Pamela Hall, musically directed by Carl Danielsen, set design by Matthew Maraffi, costume design by Laura Frecon, the Production Stage Manager was Josh Iacovelli with lighting design by Graham Kindred and Heather Layman (at DR2).

The musicians consisted of Margot Leveritt on the Klesmer, Kenny Kosek on violin and Musical Director, Carl Danielsen on piano, followed by Liz Snyder and Steven Sterner.

References

External links
http://www.curtainup.com/piconpie.html (a review from the DR2 opening)

2005 plays